28th Street may refer to the following New York City Subway stations in Manhattan:

28th Street (IRT Broadway – Seventh Avenue Line); serving the  trains
28th Street (BMT Broadway Line); serving the  trains
28th Street (IRT Lexington Avenue Line); serving the  trains
28th Street (IRT Sixth Avenue Line); demolished
28th Street (IRT Third Avenue Line); demolished

Other roadways
M-11, a highway also known as 28th Street in the Grand Rapids metropolitan area

Music
The 28th Street Crew; house-music group